Alfred Hicks (23 February 1860 – 6 September 1921) was an English-born Australian politician.

He was born in Saint Columb Major in Cornwall to agricultural labourer Richard Hicks and Phillippa Champion. He migrated to Victoria around 1881, and became a Methodist minister, preaching at Clunes, Creswick and Eaglehawk. Around 1889 he married Ada Hooper, with whom he had two children. He later left the ministry and became a grocer at Eaglehawk. From 1900 to 1906 he served on Eaglehawk Borough Council, and he was mayor from 1904 to 1905. In 1904 he was elected to the Victorian Legislative Council for Bendigo Province. He served as a minister without portfolio from 1920 until his death in Eaglehawk in 1921.

References

1860 births
1921 deaths
Nationalist Party of Australia members of the Parliament of Victoria
Members of the Victorian Legislative Council
Australian people of Cornish descent
British emigrants to Australia
Australian Methodist ministers